New Lynn is a New Zealand parliamentary electorate, returning one member to the New Zealand House of Representatives. Deborah Russell of the Labour Party has represented the electorate since the 2017 general election.

Population centres

New Lynn is based in West Auckland, straddling the borders of the former Auckland City and areas of Waitakere City. It contains the areas of New Lynn, Titirangi and Waitakere Ranges to cover all the beach-side towns on the north coast of the Manukau Harbour and then up the West Coast till Bethell's Beach.

History
It has always been held by members of the Labour Party. The electorate's first representative was Rex Mason, who had been an MP since  and who retired at the end of the term. Mason was succeeded by Jonathan Hunt, who held the electorate for the next 30 years until he contested the  electorate in the  instead. Phil Goff became the representative in New Lynn in 1996.

Titirangi replaced New Lynn in 1999 when population changes in Auckland lead to the creation of Mount Roskill, and Titirangi was won by David Cunliffe. Three years later, population growth in north Auckland led to the creation of the Helensville electorate. Cunliffe represented the New Lynn electorate until 2017.

In November 2016, Labour leader Andrew Little announced that Cunliffe would not seek re-election at the 2017 general election, and the seat was won in the election by Deborah Russell, retaining it for the Labour Party.

Members of Parliament
Unless otherwise stated, all MPs' terms began and ended at general elections.

Key

List MPs
Members of Parliament elected from party lists in elections where that person also unsuccessfully contested New Lynn. Unless otherwise stated, all MPs terms began and ended at general elections.

Election results

2020 election

2017 election

2014 election

2011 election

Electorate (as at 26 November 2011): 46,139

2008 election
|

Note: lines coloured beige denote the winner of the electorate vote. Lines coloured pink denote a candidate elected to Parliament from their party list.

2005 election

2002 election

1996 election

1993 election

1990 election

1987 election

1984 election

1981 election

1978 election

1975 election

1972 election

1969 election

1966 election

1963 election

Table footnotes

References

Bibliography

External links
Electorate Profile  Parliamentary Library

New Zealand electorates in the Auckland Region
Politics of the Auckland Region
1963 establishments in New Zealand
1999 disestablishments in New Zealand
2002 establishments in New Zealand
West Auckland, New Zealand